Luís Rafael "Rafa" Soares Alves (born 9 May 1995) is a Portuguese professional footballer who plays as a left-back for Super League Greece club PAOK FC.

Club career

Porto
Born in Marco de Canaveses, Porto District, Soares joined FC Porto's youth system in 2005 from local F.C. Alpendorada. On 21 August 2013, while still a junior, he made his professional debut with the former's B reserves, coming on as a 79th-minute substitute in a 1–0 away win against Portimonense S.C. in the Segunda Liga.

From January 2016 to June 2017, Soares was on loan to Académica de Coimbra and Rio Ave FC, with both clubs in the Primeira Liga. He played his first game in the competition on 22 January 2016 while at service of the former in a 2–1 away loss to Vitória de Setúbal, and scored his first goal the following matchday but in a 3–2 defeat at Sporting CP.

On 22 August 2017, deemed surplus to requirements by new Porto manager Sérgio Conceição, Soares was loaned to EFL Championship side Fulham in a season-long deal. He made his debut on 31 October, coming from the bench in a 0–2 home loss to Bristol City.

Soares' deal was mutually terminated by on 31 January 2018, after they had loaned Matt Targett earlier that month. The same day, he signed a permanent contract with Portimonense in his country's top flight.

Vitória Guimarães
On 6 July 2018, Soares agreed to a contract at Vitória de Guimarães. On 31 January 2020, he joined SD Eibar of Spain's La Liga on an 18-month loan with the option to buy. 

After returning from the relegated Basque team, Soares scored his first Vitória goal on 21 November 2021, as a substitute in a 3–2 defeat at neighbours Moreirense F.C. in the fourth round of the Taça de Portugal.

PAOK
In June 2022, Soares signed a three-year deal with Super League Greece club PAOK FC.

Club statistics

Honours
Porto B
LigaPro: 2015–16

References

External links

1995 births
Living people
People from Marco de Canaveses
Sportspeople from Porto District
Portuguese footballers
Association football defenders
Primeira Liga players
Liga Portugal 2 players
FC Porto B players
Associação Académica de Coimbra – O.A.F. players
Rio Ave F.C. players
Portimonense S.C. players
Vitória S.C. players
English Football League players
Fulham F.C. players
La Liga players
SD Eibar footballers
Super League Greece players
PAOK FC players
Portugal youth international footballers
Portugal under-21 international footballers
Portuguese expatriate footballers
Expatriate footballers in England
Expatriate footballers in Spain
Expatriate footballers in Greece
Portuguese expatriate sportspeople in England
Portuguese expatriate sportspeople in Spain
Portuguese expatriate sportspeople in Greece